Joaquin Piña Batllevell SJ (May 25, 1930 − 8 July 2013) was a Spanish Argentine Roman Catholic bishop.

Ordained to the priesthood for the Society of Jesus on 10 December 1961, Piña Batllevell was named bishop of the Roman Catholic Diocese of Puerto Iguazú, Argentina on 16 June 1986 and retired on 3 October 2006.

References

1930 births
2013 deaths
People from Sabadell
Spanish Roman Catholic bishops in South America
21st-century Roman Catholic bishops in Argentina
20th-century Spanish Jesuits
20th-century Roman Catholic bishops in Argentina
Roman Catholic bishops of Puerto Iguazú